Hum News is one of Pakistan's 24-hour Urdu news channel. Based in Islamabad, the channel is a business unit of Hum Television Network (HNL), her Other sister channels belonging to Network are Hum TV, Hum Masala and Hum Sitaray.

The transmission of the channel started on May 11, 2018. Hum News has bureaus in five major cities of Pakistan – Karachi, Lahore, Islamabad, Quetta, and Peshawar with reporters in every major urban center of Pakistan. Arrangements with special correspondents enable Hum News to cover stories from major cities of the world.

Footprint 

Hum News is available on Satellite PakSat-1R at 38.0 Degree and coordinates are, Downlink Frequency: 3793 MHz, Symbol Rate: 4444Ksym/s, FEC: 3/4, Polarity: Vertical. Hum News is available on these parameters in Pakistan and Middle East.

Staff 

Key staff members of Hum News are

 President: Sultana Siddiqui
 CEO: Duraid Qureshi
 Head of Programming:  Akhtar V Azeem
 Director News: Muhammad Rehan Ahmed

Anchors 

 Program ‘Breaking Point With Malick’: Muhammad Malick
 Program ‘Hum Meher Bokhari Kay Saath’: Meher Bokhari
 Program ‘Pakistan Tonight’: Syed Samar Abbas
 Program ‘Newsline’:  Maria Zulfiqar 
 Program ‘Subah Say Agay’: Shiffa Yousafzai and Ovais Mangalwala 
 Program ‘Views Makers’: Shaista Yousaf
 Program ‘Pakistan Ka Sawal’: Saad ul Hasan
 Program ‘Khabar aur Tajzia’: Muzammil Suharwardi
 Program ‘Power Politicals’: Adil Abbasi

Programs 

Hum News’ current weekday schedule consists mostly of rolling news programming during daytime hours, followed by in-depth news, informative and analysis based programs during the evening and prime time hours.

Being one of the youngest News channel in Pakistan, Hum News focuses on a younger demographic. Its bulletins boast highest number of news stories on sports, entertainment, women affairs, youth issues and climate change. Hum News also carries bell to bell coverage of Pakistan Stock Exchange (PSX) 5 days a week.

Hum News was the first channel to broadcast First Lady Bushra Bibi’s interview, besides that Hum News has done programs with the President Arif Alvi, Prime Minister Imran Khan, Governors and Chief Ministers of Provinces and several Federal Ministers. Hum News has a very versatile programming schedule which includes a variety of infotainment, political, religious and social shows.
 Subah Say Agay: is a morning show, hosted by Ovais Mangalwala and Shiffa Yousafzai. This program airs five times a week from Monday to Friday from 10 AM to 12 PM (PST). This is an infotainment show consisting of different segments for all age groups.
 Breaking Point with Malick: Hum News flagship prime time show Breaking Point with Malick is hosted by Mohammad Malick; a senior journalist. This program airs on weekdays from Monday to Thursday at 8 PM (PST). Many political figures like Interior Minister Sheikh Rasheed, IT minister Shibli Faraz and economists Shoukat Tareen have been on this show previously.
 Hum Meher Bokhari Kay Sath: Meher Bokhari; a renowned journalist and anchor hosts another prime time show. This program airs on weekdays from Monday to Thursday, at 10 PM (PST). It’s a current affairs show that mainly discusses political and social issues.
 Views Makers: Hum News flagship prime time show Views Makers is hosted by Shaista Yousaf. This program airs on weekdays from Monday to Thursday at 07 PM (PST). This is also a current affairs show but is solely based on opinions of different analysts.
 Pakistan Ka Sawal: Hum News flagship prime time show Pakistan Ka Sawal is hosted by Saad ul Hassan. This program airs on Friday and Saturday at 7 PM (PST). This show is based on lead stories of the day and he issue/ topic is discussed with related guests.
 Hum Awaz: A Roadshow from Karachi highlighting the social and environmental issues and its remedies, this show is hosted by Zunaib Khanzada. You can watch it every Sunday at 7 PM (PST).
 Pakistan Tonight: Another Prime Time talk-show of Hum News, hosted by Syed Samar Abbas. This program airs on weekends from Friday to Sunday at 8 PM (PST). This show includes all the top news and political stories.
 Newsline: It’s another weekends prime time show hosted by Dr Maria Zulfiqar Khan. This show highlights current affairs, political stories and social issues too. This program airs on weekends from Friday to Sunday, at 10 PM (PST).
 Khabar Aur Tajzia: Muzammil Suharwardi hosts a political talkshow Khabar Aur Tajzia on weekends. This program airs on Saturday and Sunday, at 5:30 PM (PST).  This show includes topics that are related to current affairs and political issues.

Special Shows 

 60 hours to Glory (PATS):
Hum News collaborated with ISPR and produced the first ever military reality show 60 HOURS TO GLORY based on 4th Pakistan Army Team Spirit Competition.

 Hum Investigates:
Hum Investigates consists of well researched and well produced documentaries based on politics, social issues, historical figures and events.

 Main Nahi Hum:
This program highlights social issues which are normally ignored and questions social stigmas of our society. Muniba Mazari hosts the program.

 Game Plan:
A special sports show based on critical analysis with cricket experts.

 Cover Page:
An entertainment show contains news and updates about entertainment industry, also about new film releases both national and international.

Hum News Special Transmissions 

Hum News has done special transmission on all special occasions like Independence Day, Elections, Iqbal Day, Kashmir Day, Quaid’s Day, Women’s Day and many more.

 SIUT Transmission:
 COVID-19 PM Telethon:
 New Year Special Transmission:
 Hum News Budget Special Transmission:
 Election Transmission 2018:
 By Election Transmission:
 Documentary on Afghanistan/ 9/11:
 PM Special Interview with Hamza Ali Abbasi:

Hum News Special for Overseas 

While COVID-19 was on peak, there was a communication gap between government officials and overseas Pakistani’s stuck in other countries, to overcome this issue Hum News launched a program with Special Assistant to PM Zulfi Bokhari.

Ramadan Transmissions 

In Ramadan, Hum news airs special Ramadan transmission.

PSL Special Show 

Hum news launched a sports show specially based on Pakistan Super League, which included a comprehensive analysis on teams, players and matches.

Hum Women Leader Awards 

Hum News is the only channel to award the efforts of women leaders around the Pakistan, and these Awards airs every year on Hum news.

Hosts 

 Ovais Mangalwala
 Shaista Yusuf
 Muhammad Malick
 Syed Sammer Abbas
 Taha Siddique
 Fazeela Sahiba
 Maria Zulfiqar
 Shiffa Yousafzai
 Lubna Abbas
 Rabia Ahsan
 Adil Abbasi

Programming 

 Power Political with Adil Abbasi
 Pakistan Tonight
 Agenda Pakistan
 Subhay Se Aaghay
 Main Nahin HUM
 HUM Investigates

Islamabad bureau/reporters
 Ibrahim Raja - Bureau Chief
 Sarfraz Raja
 Tariq Mahmood Malik
 Javed Soomro
 Nauman Maqsood
 Farid Sabri
 Rehan Syed
 Faizan Khan 
 Muhammad Zareef
 Zoohraiz Bangish

See also 

 List of news channels in Pakistan

References

24-hour television news channels in Pakistan
Television channels and stations established in 2018
Television stations in Islamabad